Estrées is a commune in the Aisne department in Hauts-de-France in northern France.

In the Picard dialect, it is called Etré. It is one of many villages in the north of France bearing the name Estrées. The etymology of the name is from strata (cognate of English "street"), the word for the stone-layered Roman roads in the area (some of which turned into modern highways). Hence Estreti, village on the road which developed into Estrées.

Also known in ancient times as Strata or Estreti, history mentions an abbey in the 12th century. A parish was created there about 1189 with a priest sent from the abbey of Mont Saint Martin to buy land and help the poor. In 1777 Pierre Nicolas Leroy began manufacturing silk gauze here. Inhabitants are called Estrésiens.

Administration

Population

See also
Communes of the Aisne department

References

Communes of Aisne
Aisne communes articles needing translation from French Wikipedia